Chiflik is a village in Vidin Province in northwestern Bulgaria. It is located in the municipality of Belogradchik. On Dec 23, 1961, the upper and lower villages of Chiflik merged to form the present village.

References

Villages in Vidin Province
Belogradchik Municipality